Căzănești is a commune in Telenești District, Moldova. It is composed of three villages: Căzănești, Vadul-Leca and Vadul-Leca Nou.

References

Communes of Telenești District
Orgeyevsky Uyezd